The 2009 Super League season (known as the Engage Super League XIV for sponsorship reasons) is the 14th season of rugby league since the Super League format was introduced in 1996. Fourteen teams competed for the Minor Premiership over 27 rounds (including the Magic Weekend at Murrayfield Stadium) after which, the highest finishing teams entered the play-offs to compete for a place in the Grand Final and a chance to win the Super League Trophy. The previous Top six play-offs are extended to eight teams.

Salford City Reds and Crusaders join the twelve teams from Super League XIII, following the implementation of a licensing system. Additionally, it was the Crusaders' first ever Super League season. The Catalans Dragons played at least one game in Barcelona, Spain, to try to expand their fan base in Catalonia region.

The season officially kicked off on 6 February, at 20:00 GMT, with a Leeds Rhinos defeat of the Celtic Crusaders. It came to a conclusion with Leeds Rhinos beating St. Helens in the Super League Grand Final on 10 October. All clubs also participated in the 2009 Challenge Cup tournament.

Teams
Super League XIV saw the introduction of a licensed Super League. Under this new system, promotion and relegation between Super League and National League One was abolished, and 14 teams were granted licences subject to certain criteria. All twelve teams from Super League XIII were given places, as well as former Super League team Salford City Reds and Crusaders, for whom it was their début season in top-flight European rugby league.

Geographically, the vast majority of teams in Super League are based in the north of England, four teams – Warrington, St. Helens, Salford and Wigan – to the west of the Pennines in Cheshire, Greater Manchester and Merseyside, and seven teams to the east in Yorkshire – Huddersfield, Bradford, Wakefield Trinity, Leeds, Castleford, Hull F.C. and Hull Kingston Rovers. Catalans Dragons are the only team outside of the United Kingdom, Crusaders are the only team in Wales, and Harlequins are the only team to be based in a capital city (London).

Rule changes
Changes to the play-off system:
 This season an eight-team play-off system was introduced to replace the previous six-team system.
 One feature of this system, known as "Club Call", is that the highest ranked team from the regular season table winning a match in the first week of the play-offs will be able to select their opponents for their next game in Week Three. This selection opportunity is only possible for teams finishing in the top three during the regular season to achieve.

Table

Play-offs

The play-offs commence following the conclusion of 27 round regular season and involve the eight sides finishing highest. The play-offs open on Friday 18 September, with the Week 1 fixtures being completed over the weekend.

A media conference is scheduled for Sunday 27 September following the conclusion of Week 2's preliminary semi-finals the day before. During the conference the highest ranked winning team from the qualifying play-offs in Week 1 will in announce which team they have chosen to play in Week 3, the next week.

The play-offs will conclude with the 2009 Super League Grand Final on 10 October.

Club Statistics 

Source: superleague.co.uk.

Notable moments
 Friday 6 February - The season kicks off at Headingley, with the defending champions Leeds Rhinos taking on Super League newcomers Crusaders. Leeds eventually win the game 28-6.
 Sunday 15 February - The first draw of the season is played out at the Grattan Stadium, as Bradford Bulls and Hull Kingston Rovers draw 13-13.
 Friday 27 February - The first game in the season to be decided by a single point is won by Hull Kingston Rovers, who beat St. Helens 19 – 20 away from home.
 Saturday 7 March - St. Helens win 4-0 at Crusaders RL in the lowest scoring match in the Super League history.
 Friday 20 March - Hull FC and Leeds both lose, breaking the two remaining 100% records in the league.
 Sunday 22 March - Wakefield's match away at Celtic is postponed due to the death of Leon Walker in the corresponding reserves fixture earlier in the day.
 Sunday 19 April - St Helens become the first team to score 60 points or more in a single game, against Castleford.
 Friday 24-Sunday 26 April - The top four teams in the league before this round; St Helens, Leeds, Huddersfield and Wakefield, all lose their fixtures.
 Sunday 26 April - Chris Hicks scores a hat-trick for the second successive weekend, this time against Huddersfield.
 Saturday 2-Sunday 3 May - The Magic Weekend fixtures, held over the May Day bank holiday weekend at Murrayfield Stadium in Edinburgh attract an aggregate attendance of approximately 60,000 attendees over the two days. Over 6,000 of these were estimated to be Scottish.
 Sunday 17 May - Celtic beat Bradford to win their first ever Super League match, ending an 11-match losing sequence.
 Saturday 23 May - Celtic host Catalans in the first ever Super League match not to feature an English side.
 Saturday 20 June - Catalans Dragons host the first Super League game to take place in Spain, at the Estadi Olímpic Lluís Companys, the venue for the 1992 Summer Olympics.
 Friday 3 July - David Howell of Harlequins becomes the first player of the season to be sent off, in Quins' match against Wigan at the JJB.
 Saturday 4 July - Keith Senior, who holds the record for most Super League appearances, plays and scores in his 500th professional match.

Awards
Awards were presented for outstanding contributions and efforts to players and clubs:
 Man of Steel: Brett Hodgson (Huddersfield Giants)
 Coach of the year: Nathan Brown (Huddersfield Giants)
 Engage Super League club of the year: Huddersfield Giants
 Young player of the year: Sam Tomkins (Wigan Warriors)
 Carnegie community player of the year: Lee Radford (Hull FC)
 Frontline Fairplay Index winners: Hull FC
 Metre-maker: James Graham (St Helens), 4,752 metres
 Hit Man: Malcolm Alker (Salford City Reds), 981 tackles
 Mike Gregory Spirit of Rugby League Award: Steve Prescott

Disciplinary record

The following table lists all incidents that were reviewed by the Rugby Football League during Super League XIV, which were later deemed "guilty" and resulted in disciplinary action. The offenses were graded, depending on severity, in alphabetical order, "A" being less severe than "B".

Operational rules
Salary cap:
 For the 2009 season, Super League clubs agreed to operate within a £1.7 million salary cap for their 25 first tier players.
The 'club trained player rule' entered its second year and made a planned adjustment:
 Clubs would be required to include a minimum of six players, an increase from five players, who have come through their academy or are under 21 years old in their 25-player first team squads. Clubs were required to have eleven United Kingdom-trained players, an increase from ten, and no more than eight overseas-trained players, a decrease from ten.

Media

Television
2009 was the first of a new three-year broadcasting agreement between the RFL and BSkyB for Sky Sports to screen matches exclusively live within the United Kingdom. The deal for the 2009, 2010 and 2011 season was worth in excess of £50 million, with media speculation that each Super League club would receive £0.9-£1.2 million in 2009.

Sky Sports' continued coverage in the UK sees two live matches broadcast each week - one on Friday Night at 7:30pm and another at 6pm on Saturdays. Regular commentators are Eddie Hemmings and Mike Stephenson with summarisers including Phil Clarke, Barrie McDermott and Terry O'Connor.  Highlights are shown on Boots N' All which is shown on Sky Sports and is rebroadcast on the Internet.

BBC Sport broadcast a highlights programme called the Super League Show, usually presented by Harry Gration. The BBC have elected to broadcast this only to the North West, Yorkshire & North Midlands, North East & Cumbria, and East Yorkshire & Lincolnshire regions on a Sunday. A national repeat is broadcast overnight during the week, the BBC Director of Sport, Richard Moseley, commented that this move was in response to the growing popularity and awareness of the sport, and the large number of requests from people who want to watch it elsewhere in the UK. End of season play-offs are shown across the whole country in a highlights package. Super League Show is available for streaming or downloaded using the BBC iPlayer in the UK.

Orange Sport TV in France shows every Catalans Dragons home match live and also some other matches which are broadcast in the UK live on Sky.

Internationally Super League is shown live on Showtime Sports (Middle East), Sky Sport (New Zealand), NTV+ (Russia), SportKlub (Eastern Europe) and Setanta Sports (USA and Canada) show Super League matches live or delayed each week.

2009 was the first of a three-year deal in which the Nine Network in Australia will show up to 70 live games from Super League over the season.

Radio
Super League XIV is covered extensively by BBC Local Radio:
 BBC Radio Manchester cover Wigan, Salford and Warrington.
 BBC Radio Humberside cover Hull KR and Hull FC.
 BBC Radio Leeds cover Bradford, Leeds, Castleford, Wakefield and Huddersfield.
 BBC Radio Merseyside (AM/DAB only) cover St Helens and Warrington.

The competition is also covered on commercial radio coverage:

 BCB 106.6 (Bradford Community Broadcasting) cover Bradford Bulls home and away.
 Radio Aire cover Leeds Rhinos.
 KCFM Hull cover Hull KR and Hull.
 Radio Marseillette covers every Catalans Dragons Home Match (in French).
 Radio France Bleu Roussillon covers every Catalans Dragons Away Match (in French).
 Yorkshire Radio cover all Yorkshire clubs and have one commentary per round which is not covered by either BBC or SKY.

All Super League commentaries on any station are available via the particular stations on-line streaming.

Internet
ESPN360 has worldwide broadband rights.

Starting from Thursday 9 April 2009, all of the matches shown on Sky Sports will also be available live online via Livestation everywhere in the world excluding the US, Puerto Rico, UK, Ireland, France, Monaco, Australia and New Zealand. List of Super League games available on Livestation.com

In the United Kingdom, BBC London 94.9, BBC Radio Wales and Radio Warrington cover Harlequins, Celtic Crusaders (home games) and Warrington (home games) respectively.

References